San Agustin Institute of Technology, commonly known as SAIT, located in Valencia City, Bukidnon, Philippines is a private educational institution. The school offers Pre-school education up to College education. SAIT has been providing Catholic education in Valencia City.

History 
San Agustin Institute of Technology (SAIT) was established in 1960 out of funds solicited from abroad by Fr. Manlio, S.J. the Catholic Priest assigned in Valencia, Bukidnon. It started as a general high school with 101 students attending classes in the parish convent.

In 1964, MISEREOR provided assistance to SAIT in terms of equipment and instructional devices and technical services from the German Technicians who assisted the founder-director in developing a Specialized Vocational Course for girls and a Trade Technical course for boys – a Special Automotive Mechanic course.

On March 5, 2008, SAIT was able to launch the Fr. Caroselli, S.J., Development Foundation Inc. This foundation was founded in order to help the poor-but-deserving students; helping them make a difference in their life and the lives of others. Under the present administration, SAIT is made to effect improvements for the development of the students.

Academic programs

Basic Education
Junior Kindergarten (4–5 years old)
Senior Kindergarten (5–6 years old)
Complete Elementary Education, Grades 1-6
Complete Junior High School, Grades 7-10
Complete Junior Night High School, Grades 7-10
Complete Senior High School, Grades 11-12

Tertiary Education
List of available courses:
4-Year CHED Courses
Bachelor of Science in Business Administration
BSBA-Major in Management
BSBA-Major in Economics
BSBA-Major in Financial Management
Bachelor in Elementary Education-Major in Filipino
Bachelor in Secondary Education-Major in Mathematics
Bachelor in Secondary Education-Major in Filipino
Bachelor of Science in Industrial Education
BSIEd-Major in Automotive Technology
BSIEd-Major in Electrical Technology
BSIEd-Major in Food Technology
BSIEd-Major in Handicraft
Bachelor of Science in Social Work
Bachelor of Science in Midwifery
Graduate Courses
Graduate in Midwifery
2-Year CHED Courses
General Clerical Course
Associate in Office Administration-Major in Stenography
Associate in Office Administration-Major in Computer
1-Year TESDA Programs
Building Wiring Installation
Automotive Technology
Health Care Services Provider
New CHED Courses Applied (Started on AY 2009-2010)
Bachelor of Science in Technical Teacher Education (BSTTE)
Bachelor of Science in Entrepreneurship
Bachelor of Science in Office Administration

See also 
Valencia City, Bukidnon
Education in the Philippines

References

External links
 Official website
 

Education in Valencia, Bukidnon
Educational institutions established in 1960
Universities and colleges in Bukidnon
High schools in the Philippines
1960 establishments in the Philippines